Suturoglypta pretrii is a species of very small sea snail, a marine gastropod mollusc in the family Columbellidae, the dove snails.

Description
The length of the shell attains 8.5 mm.

Distribution

References

 Petit de la Saussaye, S., 1851. Notice sur un groupe de coquilles classées parmi les Fuseaux (Fusus, Lam.), avec description de plusieurs espèces. Journal de Conchyliologie 2: 73-79
 Rosenberg, G.; Moretzsohn, F.; García, E. F. (2009). Gastropoda (Mollusca) of the Gulf of Mexico, Pp. 579–699 in: Felder, D.L. and D.K. Camp (eds.), Gulf of Mexico–Origins, Waters, and Biota. Texas A&M Press, College Station, Texas.
 Pelorce J. (2017). Les Columbellidae (Gastropoda: Neogastropoda) de la Guyane française. Xenophora Taxonomy. 14: 4-21

External links
  Duclos P.L. (1846-1850). Colombella. In J.C. Chenu, Illustrations conchyliologiques ou description et figures de toutes les coquilles connues vivantes et fossiles, classées suivant le système de Lamarck modifié d'après les progrès de la science et comprenant les genres nouveaux et les espèces récemment découvertes. Volume 4: pls 1-18
 Dall, W. H. (1889). Reports on the results of dredging, under the supervision of Alexander Agassiz, in the Gulf of Mexico (1877-78) and in the Caribbean Sea (1879-80), by the U.S. Coast Survey Steamer "Blake", Lieut.-Commander C.D. Sigsbee, U.S.N., and Commander J.R. Bartlett, U.S.N., commanding. XXIX. Report on the Mollusca. Part 2, Gastropoda and Scaphopoda. Bulletin of the Museum of Comparative Zoölogy at Harvard College. 18: 1-492, pls. 10-40
 Reeve, L. A. (1858–1859). Monograph of the Genus Columbella. In: Conchologia Iconica, or, illustrations of the shells of molluscous animals, vol. 11, pl. 1-37 and unpaginated text. L. Reeve & Co., London

Columbellidae
Gastropods described in 1846